Lentibacillus alimentarius is a Gram-positive, endospore-forming and rod-shaped bacterium from the genus of Lentibacillus which has been isolated from the food Myeolchi-jeotgal.

References

Bacillaceae
Bacteria described in 2018